Ajloun (‘Ajlūn), also spelled Ajlun, is the capital town of the Ajloun Governorate, a hilly town in the north of Jordan, located 76 kilometers (around 47 miles) north west of Amman. It is noted for its impressive ruins of the 12th-century Ajloun Castle.

The Ajlun Governorate has a population of over 176,080 widespread in 27 villages and towns over an area of about 420 km². The population is mainly composed of the following Muslim tribe: AlQudah is the main family.Christian tribes in Ajloun. Although Christians are a minority in the overall governorate, they form about more than half of the population in Ajloun city; most Christians reside in Ajloun city along with Muslims of the Al-Smadi tribe. Other tribes are distributed in the other districts of the governorate. Ajloun Governorate has four seats in the national parliament, one of which is dedicated for the 
Christian minority.

Districts of Metropolitan Ajloun
There are five districts in the Greater Ajloun Municipality:

History
It had a population of 313 Muslim households, and 20 Muslim bachelors, in addition to 20 Christian households. They paid taxes  on various  agricultural products, including olive trees, vineyards, fruit trees, vegetables and fruit garden, orchards, bayt al-mal wa mal ga'ib,  goats and beehives, in addition to  occasional revenues; a market toll and water mill; a total of  14,500 akçe.

In 1838 Ajloun's inhabitants were predominantly Sunni Muslims and Greek Christians.

The Jordanian census of 1961 found 5390 inhabitants in Ajloun, of whom 2023 were Christians.

Demographics
According to the Jordan national census of 2015, the population of the town of Ajloun was 9990.  For Ajloun Governorate as a whole, the population was about 176,080 in 2015. Muslims make up the majority of Ajloun's population. They live alongside the Christian population.
The governorate of Ajloun is highly agricultural.

Geography
There is a theory that the town's name is connected with the Moabite King Eglon mentioned in the Bible, though the precise derivation is obscure.

Ajlun Castle is located on the site of an old monastery. It was renovated as a fort in 1184 by Izz al-Din Usama, a general in the army of Saladin. The castle controlled traffic along the road connecting Damascus and Egypt. The fortress marks the furthest limit of Frankish incursions during the Crusades. The Mamluks added a prominent tower to the castle. It was captured by the Mongols in 1260 and was partially destroyed in the process. Great damage was done by the Galilee earthquake of 1837 and the 1927 Jericho earthquake.

Located in the center of Ajloun is the Great Ajlun Mosque.  This mosque is one of the oldest extant in Jordan and dates back around 800 years. This edifice was previously a Byzantine Christian church; there have been reports of Greek writing in the oldest sections.  The prayer tower is called "the filter" by some locals (referring to a cigarette filter, because half of the tower was built over a square tower, most likely a Church bell tower).  In 2007 work began on improving the mosque to allow tourists to visit it.  There are also reports that when the west wall fell apart in the heavy rains and snow in January 2013 a Bible and crosses were found in the old section.

Tell Mar Elias is located just outside the city limits.  This site contains Byzantine church mosaics which were uncovered during the summer months for tourists. T tohis location for Saint Elijah (Mar Elias) has been a shrine for centuries – people would go there and walk around the shrine singing ancient songs to cure a disease called "Rigeh".  There are folk songs they sang for this visit.  However, prior to the Pope's visit in 2000. A scholar on both Mar Elias and Ajlun Castle is Mohammad Abu-Abeileh in Jordan.

The Ajloun Forest Reserve is also located nearby. The whole area had been reputed to be the largest forested area in the Middle East – however, the area was largely deforested by the Turks to secure fuel for their railroad to Mecca.

Climate
Ajloun, has a mediterranean climate (Köppen climate classification: Csa).

Topography
The Ajloun mountains are famous for their lush vegetation and thick green forests, many locals and tourists visit the area for hiking. Its highest mountain peaks reach around 1268 meters above sea level and Ajloun mountains receive a few snow storms every year, usually in the winter season from December to March. It's one of the country's most beautiful regions. Ajloun has a Mediterranean weather rainy and snowy in winter season and pleasant in the summer time.

Notable people 

 Shaher Momani, Mathematics Professor (2009–present) at University of Jordan, grew up and educated in Ajloun.

Landmarks
 Ajloun Castle
 Tell Mar Elias
 Great Ajloun Mosque
 Ajloun Holy Spirit Church
 Shrine for Al-Khadir (St. George)
 Birthplace of the Prophet Elijah (at Listib)

Gallery

References

Bibliography

Further reading

External links

 http://www.visitjordan.com/visitjordan_cms/MajorAttractions/Ajlun/HistoryCulture/tabid/173/Default.aspx
 Jordan Tourism Board 
 Middle East Travel Guide
 Ajlun Discussion Forum 
 Photos of Ajlun at the American Center of Research

Populated places in Ajloun Governorate